Latulipe-et-Gaboury is a united township municipality in northwestern Quebec, Canada, in the Témiscamingue Regional County Municipality.  The only other remaining united township municipality in Quebec is Stoneham-et-Tewkesbury.

Demographics 

Population trend:
 Population in 2021: 320 (2016 to 2021 population change: 8.5%)
 Population in 2016: 295 
 Population in 2011: 304 
 Population in 2006: 333
 Population in 2001: 357
 Population in 1996: 351
 Population in 1991: 366

Private dwellings occupied by usual residents: 159 (total dwellings: 225)

Mother tongue:
 English as first language: 0%
 French as first language: 100%
 English and French as first language: 0%
 Other as first language: 0%

See also
 List of township municipalities in Quebec

References

United township municipalities in Quebec
Incorporated places in Abitibi-Témiscamingue
Témiscamingue Regional County Municipality